Konstantin Nikolayevich Kamnev (born 20 June 1972) is a former Russian professional footballer.

Club career
He made his professional debut in the Soviet Second League in 1991 for SKA Odessa. He played 4 games in the UEFA Cup 1996–97 for FC Torpedo-Luzhniki Moscow.

Honours
 Russian Cup winner: 1997.

References

1972 births
Footballers from Odesa
Living people
Soviet footballers
Russian footballers
Association football midfielders
SKA Odesa players
FC Akhmat Grozny players
FC Asmaral Moscow players
Russian Premier League players
FC Torpedo Moscow players
FC Torpedo-2 players
FC Lokomotiv Moscow players
FC Chornomorets Odesa players
FC Chernomorets Novorossiysk players
FC Moscow players
FC Elista players
Ukrainian Premier League players
FC Lokomotiv Kaluga players
FC Yenisey Krasnoyarsk players